The United Kingdom, being in the British Isles, is ideal for tree growth, thanks to its mild winters, plentiful rainfall, fertile soil and hill-sheltered topography.  Growth rates for broadleaved (hardwood) trees exceed those of mainland Europe, while conifer (softwood) growth rates are three times those of Sweden and five times those of Finland.  In the absence of people, much of Great Britain would be covered with mature oaks, except for Scotland.  Although conditions for forestry are good, trees do face damage threats arising from fungi, parasites and pests. The development of afforestation and the production and supply of timber in Wales come under Natural Resources Wales, as set out in the Forestry Act 1967.

Nowadays, about 13% of Britain's land surface is wooded.  The country's supply of timber was severely depleted during the First and Second World Wars, when imports were difficult, and the forested area bottomed out at under 5% of Britain's land surface in 1919.  That year, the Forestry Commission was established to produce a strategic reserve of timber. As of 2020, other European countries average from 1% (Malta) to 66% (Finland) of their area as woodland.

More than 40,000 people work on this land. Conifers account for around one half (51%) of the UK woodland area, although this proportion varies from around one quarter (26%) in England to around three quarters (74%) in Scotland. Britain's native tree flora comprises 32 species, of which 29 are broadleaves. Britain's industry and populace uses at least 50 million tonnes of timber a year. More than 75% of this is softwood, and Britain's forests cannot supply the demand; in fact, less than 10% of the timber used in Britain is home-grown. Paper and paper products make up more than half the wood consumed in Britain by volume.

In October 2010, the new coalition government of the UK suggested it might sell off around half the Forestry Commission-owned woodland in the UK.  A wide variety of groups were vocal about their disapproval, and by February 2011, the government abandoned the idea.  Instead, it set up the Independent Panel on Forestry led by Rt Rev James Jones, then the Bishop of Liverpool.  This body published its report in July 2012.  Among other suggestions, it recommended that the forested portion of England should rise to 15% of the country's land area by 2060.  As of 2021, government plans call for 30,000 hectares of afforestation per annum.  Efforts to reach these targets have attracted criticism for planting non-native trees, or trees that are out of place for their surroundings, leading to ecological changes.

Background
 
Throughout most of British history, people have most commonly created farmland at the expense of forest. Furthermore, variations in the Holocene climate have led to significant changes in the ranges of many species. This makes it complex to estimate the likely extent of natural forest cover. For example, in Scotland four main areas have been identified: oak dominated forest south of the Highland Line, Scots Pine in the Central Highlands, hazel/oak or pine/birch/oak assemblages in the north-east and south-west Highlands, and birch in the Outer Hebrides, Northern Isles and far north of the mainland. Furthermore, the effects of fire, human clearance and grazing probably limited forest cover to about 50% of the land area of Scotland even at its maximum. The stock of woodland declined alarmingly during the First World War and "a Forestry Subcommittee was added
to the Reconstruction Committee to advise on policy when the war was over. The Subcommittee, better known as the Acland Committee after its chairman Sir A. H. D. Acland, came to the conclusion that, in order to secure the double purpose of being able to be independent from foreign supplies for three years and a reasonable insurance against a timber famine, the woods of Great Britain should be gradually increased from three million acres to four and three quarter millions at the end of the war". Following the Acland Report of 1918 the Forestry Commission was formed in 1919 to meet this need.  State forest parks were established in 1935.

Emergency felling controls had been introduced in the First and Second World Wars, and these were made permanent in the Forestry Act 1951. Landowners were also given financial incentives to devote land to forests under the Dedication Scheme, which in 1981 became the Forestry Grant Scheme. Most of this planting comprised fast-growing conifers. By the mid-1990s, more than half of new planting was broadleaf.

In 1988, the Woodland Grant Scheme replaced the Forestry Grant Scheme, paying nearly twice as much for broadleaf woodland as conifers.  (In England, the Woodland Grant Scheme was subsequently replaced by the English Woodland Grant Scheme, which operates six separate kinds of grant for forestry projects.) That year, the Farm Woodlands Scheme was also introduced, and replaced by the Farm Woodland Premium Scheme in 1992.  In the 1990s, a programme of afforestation resulted in the establishment of Community Forests and the National Forest, which celebrated the planting of its seven millionth tree in 2006.  As a result of these initiatives, the British Isles are one of a very few places in the world where the stock of forested land is actually increasing, though the rate of increase has slowed since the turn of the millennium.

England Rural Development Programme is the current overarching grants scheme that includes money for forested land within it.

Ancient woodland

Ancient woodland is defined as any woodland that has been continuously forested since 1600. It is recorded on either the Register of Ancient Semi-Natural Woodland or the Register of Planted Woodland Sites.  There is no woodland in Britain that has not been profoundly affected by human intervention. Apart from certain native pinewoods in Scotland, it is predominantly broadleaf. Such woodland is less productive, in terms of timber yield, but ecologically rich, typically containing a number of "indicator species" of indigenous wildlife.  It comprises roughly 20% of the forested area.

Native and historic tree species
Britain is relatively impoverished in terms of native species. For example, only thirty-one species of deciduous tree and shrub are native to Scotland, including ten willows, four whitebeams and three birch and cherry. This is a list of tree species that existed in Britain before 1900.  The sheer number of tree species planted subsequently precludes a complete list.

{| class="sortable wikitable"
! Common name !! Scientific name !! Period !! Type !! style="width:20%" | Notes
|-
| Ash || Fraxinus excelsior || Native ||Broadleaf || -
|-
| Aspen || Populus tremula || Native || Broadleaf || -
|-
| Atlas cedar || Cedrus atlantica || 1800–1900 || Conifer || -
|-
| Austrian pine || Pinus nigra || 1800–1900 || Conifer || -
|-
| Bay willow || Salix pentandra || Native || Broadleaf || -
|-
| Beech || Fagus sylvatica || Native || Broadleaf || -
|-
| Bird cherry || Prunus padus || Native || Broadleaf || -
|-
| Black cottonwood || Populus trichocarpa || 1800–1900 || Broadleaf || -
|-
| Black poplar || Populus nigra || Native || Broadleaf || -
|-
| Black walnut || Juglans nigra || 1600–1800 || Broadleaf || -
|-
| Box || Buxus sempervirens || Native || Broadleaf || -
|-
| Caucasian fir || Abies nordmanniana || 1800–1900 || Conifer || -
|-
| Cedar of Lebanon || Cedrus libani || 1600–1800 || Conifer || -
|-
| Coast redwood || Sequoia sempervirens || 1800–1900 || Conifer || -
|-
| Common alder || Alnus glutinosa || Native || Broadleaf || -
|-
| Common juniper || Juniperus communis || Native || Conifer || -
|-
| Common lime || Tilia x vulgaris || 1600–1800 || Broadleaf || -
|-
| Common silver fir || Abies alba || 1600–1800 || Conifer || -
|-
| Common walnut || Juglans regia || pre-1600 || Broadleaf || -
|-
| Corsican pine || Pinus nigra ||  1600–1800 || Conifer || -
|-
| Crab apple || Malus sylvestris || Native || Broadleaf || -
|-
| Crack willow || Salix fragilis || Native || Broadleaf || -
|-
| Cricket-bat willow || Salix alba, var caerulea || 1600–1800 || Broadleaf || -
|-
| Deodar cedar || Cedrus deodara || 1800–1900 || Conifer || -
|-
| Douglas fir || Pseudotsuga menziesii || 1800–1900 || Conifer || Tallest tree in the UK
|-
| Downy birch || Betula pubescens || Native || Broadleaf || May have been the first tree to grow in Britain after the ice age
|-
| English elm || Ulmus procera || pre-1600 || Broadleaf || Despite the name, not a native species
|-
| Eucalypts || Eucalyptus species || 1800–1900 || Broadleaf || -
|-
| European larch || Larix decidua || 1600–1800 || Conifer || -
|-
| Field maple || Acer campestre || Native || Broadleaf || -
|-
| Giant fir || Abies grandis || 1800–1900 || Conifer || -
|-
| Giant sequoia || Sequoiadendron giganteum || 1850s– Present || Conifer || - Found in botanical gardens and private estates
|-
| Grey alder || Alnus incana || 1600–1800 || Broadleaf || -
|-
| Grey poplar || Populus x canescens || pre-1600 || Broadleaf || -
|-
| Hawthorn || Crataegus monogyna || Native || Broadleaf || -
|-
| Hazel || Corylus avellana || Native || Broadleaf || -
|-
| Holly || Ilex aquifolium || Native || Broadleaf || -
|-
| Holm oak || Quercus ilex || pre-1600 || Broadleaf || -
|-
| Hornbeam || Carpinus betulus || Native || Broadleaf || -
|-
| Horse chestnut || Aesculus hippocastanum || 1600–1800 || Broadleaf || -
|-
| Italian alder || Alnus cordata || 1800–1900 || Broadleaf || -
|-
| Japanese larch || Larix kaempferi || 1800–1900 || Conifer || -
|-
| Large-leaved lime || Tilia platyphyllos || Native || Broadleaf || -
|-
| Lawson cypress || Chamaecyparis lawsoniana || 1800–1900 || Conifer || -
|-
| Lodgepole pine || Pinus contorta || 1800–1900 || Conifer || -
|-
| Lombardy poplar || Populus nigra var. italica || 1600–1800 || Broadleaf || -
|-
| London plane || Platanus x hispanica || 1600–1800 || Broadleaf ||
|-
| Maritime pine || Pinus pinaster || pre-1600 || Conifer || -
|-
| Midland thorn || Crataegus laevigata || Native || Broadleaf || -
|-
| Monkey puzzle || Araucaria araucana || 1600–1800 || Conifer || -
|-
| Monterey cypress || Cupressus macrocarpa || 1800–1900 || Conifer || -
|-
| Monterey pine || Pinus radiata || 1800–1900 || Conifer || -
|-
| Noble fir || Abies procera || 1800–1900 || Conifer || -
|-
| Norway maple || Acer platanoides || 1600–1800 || Broadleaf || -
|-
| Norway spruce || Picea abies || pre-1600 || Conifer || Supplanted as most common forestry species by Sitka spruce
|-
| Oriental plane || Platanus orientalis || pre-1600 || Broadleaf || -
|-
| Pedunculate oak || Quercus robur || Native || Broadleaf || Also called the English Oak
|-
| Red alder || Alnus rubra || 1800–1900 || Broadleaf || -
|-
| Red oak || Quercus rubra || 1600–1800 || Broadleaf || -
|-
| Robusta poplar || Populus x robusta || 1800–1900 || Broadleaf || -
|-
| Rowan || Sorbus aucuparia || Native || Broadleaf || -
|-
| Sallow (Goat willow) || Salix caprea || Native || Broadleaf || -
|-
| Scots pine || Pinus sylvestris || Native || Conifer || -
|-
| Serotina poplar || Populus x serotina || 1600–1800 || Broadleaf || -
|-
| Sessile oak || Quercus petraea || Native || Broadleaf || -
|-
| Silver birch || Betula pendula || Native || Broadleaf || -
|-
| Sitka spruce || Picea sitchensis || 1800–1900 || Conifer || Most common forestry species
|-
| Small-leaved lime || Tilia cordata || Native || Broadleaf || -
|-
| Smooth-leaved elm || Ulmus carpinifolia || pre-1600 || Broadleaf || -
|-
| Southern beech || Nothofagus antarctica || 1800–1900 || Broadleaf || -
|-
| Swamp cypress || Taxodium distichum || 1600–1800 || Conifer || -
|-
| Swedish whitebeam || Sorbus intermedia || pre-1600 || Broadleaf || -
|-
| Sweet chestnut || Castanea sativa || pre-1600 || Broadleaf || -
|-
| Sycamore || Acer pseudoplatanus || pre-1600 || Broadleaf || -
|-
| Turkey oak || Quercus cerris || 1600–1800 || Broadleaf || -
|-
| Wellingtonia || Sequoiadendron giganteum || 1800–1900 || Conifer || -
|-
| Western hemlock || Tsuga heterophylla || 1800–1900 || Conifer || -
|-
| Western red cedar || Thuja plicata || 1800–1900 || Conifer || -
|-
| White poplar || Populus alba || pre-1600 || Broadleaf || -
|-
| White willow || Salix alba || Native || Broadleaf || -
|-
| Whitebeam || Sorbus aria || Native || Broadleaf || -
|-
| Wild cherry (Gean) || Prunus avium || Native || Broadleaf || -
|-
| Wild service tree || Sorbus torminalis || Native || Broadleaf || -
|-
| Wych elm || Ulmus glabra || Native || Broadleaf || -
|-
| Yew || Taxus baccata || Native || Conifer || -
|-
|}

Threats

Most serious disease threats to British woodland involve fungus.  For conifers, the greatest threat is white rot fungus (Heterobasidion annosum).  Dutch elm disease arises from two related species of fungi in the genus Ophiostoma, spread by elm bark beetles.  Another fungus, Nectria coccinea, causes Beech bark disease, as does Bulgaria polymorpha.  Ash canker results from Nectria galligena or Pseudomonas savastanoi, and most trees are vulnerable to Honey Fungus (Armillaria mellea). The oomycete Phytophthora ramorum (responsible for "Sudden oak death" in the USA) has killed large numbers of Japanese Larch trees in the UK. 

Acute oak decline has a bacterial cause.  Beetles, moths and weevils can also damage trees, but the majority do not cause serious harm.  Notable exceptions include the Large Pine Weevil (Hylobius abietis), which can kill young conifers, the Spruce Bark Beetle (Ips typographus) which can kill spruces, and the Cockchafer (Melolontha melolontha) which eats young tree roots and can kill in a dry season.  Rabbits, squirrels, voles, field mice, deer, and farm animals can pose a significant threat to trees.  Air pollution, climate change, acid rain, and wildfire represent the main environmental hazards.

Timber industry
In 2013, the UK produced 3,582,000 cubic metres of sawn wood, 3,032,000 cubic metres of wood-based panels and  4,561,000 tonnes of paper and paperboard.  The UK does not produce enough timber to satisfy domestic demand, and the country imports 80% of its timber and paper from abroad, as the world's second largest timber importer after China. The majority of sawn softwood imports come from the Baltic, in particular Sweden (42%), Latvia (16%) and Finland (14%). In 2008 the country imported sawn and other wood to a value of £1,243 million and exported £98 million; imported £832 million of wood-based panels and exported £104 million; and imported paper and paper-based products to a value of £4,273 million and exported £1,590 million.  In 2012 approximately 15,000 people were employed in forestry and 26,000 in primary wood production in the country, resulting in a gross value added to the country of £1,936 million. Most of the domestically produced construction timber is spruce graded to the strength class C16. With the ongoing closure of sawmills, the biomass industry is likely to be a key driver for future growth.

Planting
Successful forestry requires healthy, well-formed trees that are resistant to diseases and parasites.  The best wood has a straight, circular stem without a spiral grain or fluting, and small, evenly spaced branches.  The chances of achieving these are maximised by planting good-quality seed in the best possible growing environment.

Stewardship and management 

The Forestry Commission was established in 1919, in order to address a lack  of timber following the First World War: at this point Britain had only 5% of its original forest cover left and the government at that time wanted to create a strategic resource of timber. Since then forest coverage has doubled and the commission's remit expanded to include greater focus on sustainable forest management and maximising public benefits. Woodland creation continues to be an important role of the commission, however, and works closely with government to achieve its goal of 12% forest coverage by 2060, championing initiatives such as The Big Tree Plant and Woodland Carbon Code. Originally, the commission operated across Great Britain, however in 2013 Natural Resources Wales took over responsibility for Forestry in Wales, whilst two new bodies (Forestry and Land Scotland and Scottish Forestry) were established in Scotland on 1 April 2019. The Commission retains responsibility for forestry in England, as well as co-coordinating international forestry policy support and certain plant health functions in respect of trees and forestry across the UK. The Forestry Commission is also the government body responsible for the regulation of private forestry in England; felling is generally illegal without first obtaining a licence from the commission. The commission is also responsible for encouraging new private forest growth and development. Part of this role is carried out by providing grants in support of private forests and woodlands.

Tree breeding programmes, to ensure the best seed, are hampered by the trees' long life-cycles.  However, particularly since the 1950s, the Forestry Commission among other organisations has been running a programme of breeding, propagation, induced flowering and controlled pollination with the aim of producing healthy, disease-resistant, fast-growing stock.

Natural Resources Wales is a Welsh Government sponsored body, for the management of all the natural resources of Wales. It was formed from a merger of the Countryside Council for Wales, Environment Agency Wales, and the Forestry Commission Wales, and also assumes some other roles formerly taken by Welsh Government. Other organisations working in Wales to improve the management of Welsh woodlands and forests include the Confederation of Forest Industries, Coed Cymru and Woodknowledge Wales.

For forestry in Scotland, both Forestry and Land Scotland and Scottish Forestry are executive agency of the Scottish Government. The key functions of Forestry and Land Scotland (FLS) are to look after the national forest estate, including unforested land within this portfolio, and to produce and supply timber. It is expected to enhance biodiversity, increase public access to the outdoors, encourage tourism and support the rural economy. Scottish Forestry is responsible for regulation, policy and support to landowners, including regulation of FLS.

The Forest Stewardship Council, more specifically FSC UK, sets forest management standards for the UK, promotes the system and provides an information service. It looks at the environmental, social and economic impacts of the timber industry.

Transportation 

Currently, the vast majority of Britain's timber uses road haulage. As forests are located in rural areas, the heavy timber vehicles have severely damaged many single lane tracks, especially in the Highlands. In order to combat this, companies are being forced to provide funding for repairs, as well as using alternative transport systems such as rail and coastal shipping. Despite the number of forest railways plummeting after the Beeching Axe, rail's share of timber transport has risen from 3% in 2002 with the opening of new lines in Devon, the Pennines, Scotland and South Wales by Colas Rail.

Land values

The price of woodland has risen out of proportion to its productivity, and in 2012 reached peak prices over £10,000 per acre.  Woodland prices are affected by its very favourable tax treatment and its high amenity value.

See also
 List of forests in the United Kingdom
 List of Great British Trees
 List of renewable resources produced and traded by the United Kingdom
 English Lowlands beech forests
 Woodland Carbon Code
 Natural Forest Standard
 Forestry in Scotland

References 
Footnotes

Citations

Bibliography

External links 

 
Forests and woodlands of the United Kingdom